Diederik J.H. van Dijk (born 22 November 1971 in Driebergen-Rijsenburg) is a Dutch non-executive director and a politician of the Reformed Political Party (SGP). Since 9 June 2015 he has been a member of the Senate.

Van Dijk studied law at Utrecht University. Since 1996, he has been a policy assistant to the Reformed Political Party fraction in the House of Representatives, dealing with foreign affairs, defense, European affairs, infrastructure and environment.

In the past, he was among others chair of the Reformed Political Party election committee in The Hague, a member of the board of directors of the Reformed teachers' college Driestar Hogeschool at Gouda, and an elder as well as chair of the diaconate in the Dutch Reformed Bethlehemkerk at The Hague. Nowadays he is among others a member of the supervisory board of the Reformed news media company Erdee Media Groep as well as of the care facilities Sorg and Lelie Zorggroep, and an elder in the Restored Reformed Church at Waddinxveen.

Diederik van Dijk is married and lives in Benthuizen.

References 
  Parlement.com biography

External links 
  Senate biography

1971 births
Living people
Deacons
Dutch columnists
Dutch corporate directors
Dutch jurists
Members of the Senate (Netherlands)
People from Driebergen-Rijsenburg
Reformed Political Party politicians
Dutch Calvinist and Reformed Christians
Utrecht University alumni